Municipal Model High School, established in 1880, is one of the oldest schools in Bangladesh.The school is located at the Chittagong Biapni Bitan. In fact, it is adjacent to the north boundary wall of the Market which people know as Newmarket in Chittagong.It provides education from 6th to 12th grade.

History
In 1880,Municipal High School was established by a Chittagonian social worker named Shyamacharan Sen.It was first established as a junior English School.Founder Shyamacharan served as the first principal of Municipal High School.

References

1880 establishments in India
Schools in Chittagong